Paul Tierney (born 25 December 1980) is a football referee from Wigan, Greater Manchester, who referees in the English Premier League.  He first officiated in the Premier League on 30 August 2014. Tierney was promoted to the FIFA list of referees in 2018, but was removed again in 2022. He is registered with the Lancashire Football Association.

Tierney was the assistant referee for the 2010 FA Cup Final. At the time of his promotion to the Select Group, Tierney had been on the National List of Referees since 2009 and had refereed more than 230 matches. He was the fourth official for the 2014 FA Vase Final.

He made his third appearance at Wembley 27 May 2019, when he officiated the  Championship play-off final between Aston Villa and Derby County.

On 25 April 2021, Tierney officiated the 2021 EFL Cup Final between Manchester City and Tottenham Hotspur.

See also
List of football referees

References

External links 

1980 births
English football referees
Living people
Premier League referees
People from Wigan